The Cyclone-class patrol ships are a class of United States Navy coastal patrol boats. Most of these ships were launched between 1992 and 1994. The primary mission of these ships is coastal patrol and interdiction surveillance, an important aspect of littoral operations outlined in the Navy's strategy, "Forward...From the Sea." These ships also provide full mission support for U.S. Navy SEALs and other special operations forces.

The Cyclone-class ships are assigned to Naval Special Warfare. Of the 14 ships, nine originally operated out of the Naval Amphibious Base Little Creek, Norfolk, Virginia, and four originally operated from the Naval Amphibious Base Coronado. These ships provide the United States Naval Special Warfare Command with a fast, reliable platform that can respond to emergent requirements in a low intensity conflict environment. Three ships were decommissioned and loaned to the United States Coast Guard to be returned to the Navy in 2011, while lead ship Cyclone was transferred to the Philippine Navy. Shamal, Tornado, and Zephyr were returned to the U.S. Navy in 2011 and placed back in commission.

The ships that were on loan to the U.S. Coast Guard were used in a variety of roles, including search and rescue, interception, boarding, and inspection of foreign freighters arriving at United States ports.

In September 2010, the decision was made to recall all of the remaining ships of the class due to fatigue damage to their hulls. The class was designed for a lifespan of roughly 15 years. All but the newest member of the class, have been in service longer. The vessels will be inspected and a decision will be made whether to refit them or to decommission the ships.

As of 2015, ten of the U.S. Navy's 13 Cyclone-class patrol ships were deployed to Naval Support Activity Bahrain in the Persian Gulf, to deal with a potential conflict with Iran. The remaining three ships of the class are slated to be transferred to Naval Station Mayport in Florida to primarily perform drug interdiction duties with U.S. Naval Forces Southern Command (USNAVSO) / U.S. Fourth Fleet.

Development and design

In the 1980s, the U.S. Navy developed a requirement for a replacement for the Vietnam War-era PB Mk III small patrol boats used to transport SEAL teams. The SWCM, nicknamed "Sea Viking", was a failure, however, and construction of the prototype was abandoned in 1987.

After the failure of the innovative SWCM, it was decided to replace the PB Mk IIIs with a simple development of an existing design rather than wait for an entirely new design to be produced and developed. Bollinger Shipyards proposed a development of the Vosper Thornycroft  built for Oman and Kenya, and this was selected by the U.S. Navy.

At , the new design, at first designated PBC (Patrol Boat Coastal), and later PC, was much larger than the boats that they were to replace. It was planned to build 16 PBCs to replace the 17 PB Mk IIIs, with first deliveries expected in 1991. The program was stopped at 14 boats, however, as it was realised that the PC was too large for the SEAL delivery role.

Operational career
Following the 2003 occupation of Iraq, the Cyclone-class boats were deployed to guard Iraq's offshore oil terminal.  When Iraq took over responsibility for the terminal's defense, in 2005, ten of the Cyclone-class boats remained in the Persian Gulf, performing other patrol duties.

On 30 March 2022, the Royal Bahrain Naval Forces commissioned five Cyclone-class patrol vessels that were decommissioned by the USN at Manama.

Ships in class

Zephyr, Shamal, and Tornado were homeported at Joint Expeditionary Base Little Creek (Virginia) but shifted homeport to Naval Station Mayport (Florida). All three were decommissioned in February 2021. Zephyr and Shamal are set to be scrapped while Tornado will be made available for sale to a foreign military.

Users

Current 
  (1)
  (5)
  (5)

Past 
  (5 returned to U.S. Navy)

See also
 Mark V Special Operations Craft
 Special Operations Craft – Riverine (SOC-R)
 Mark VI patrol boat

References

Sources
 Baker, A.D. The Naval Institute Guide to Combat Fleets of the World 1998–1999. Annapolis, Maryland: Naval Institute Press, 1998. .
 Gardiner, Robert and Stephen Chumbley. Conway's All The World's Fighting Ships 1947–1995. Annapolis, Maryland USA: Naval Institute Press, 1995. .
 Moore, John. Jane's Fighting Ships 1985–86. London: Jane's Yearbooks, 1985. .
 Prézelin, Bernard and Baker, A.D. The Naval Institute Guide to Combat Fleets of the World 1990/1991. Annapolis, Maryland, USA: Naval Institute Press, 1990. .

External links

 U.S. Navy Fact Sheet
  PC-1 Cyclone class Patrol Coastal Craft (globalsecurity.org)
 WPC-179 Cyclone Patrol Coastal Craft (globalsecurity.org)
 Program Executive Office, Ships - PC
 FAS.org
 Navy Times article on repairs to the class.

 

Patrol boat classes
 
Naval ships of the United States
Patrol vessels of the United States